Tissue factor pathway inhibitor 2 is a protein that in humans is encoded by the TFPI2 gene.

References

Further reading